Sarab Biz (also Romanized as Sarāb Bīz; also known as Sar Āb Bīz-e Bālā, Sarāb Bīz ‘Olyā, Sarābīz-e Bālā, and Sarāb Nabīz) is a village in Babuyi Rural District, Basht District, Basht County, Kohgiluyeh and Boyer-Ahmad Province, Iran. At the 2006 census, its population was 891, in 150 families.

References 

Populated places in Basht County